Three ships of the Royal Navy have borne the name HMS Albany:

  was a 14-gun sloop launched in 1745 and captured by the French in 1746.
She was renamed HMS Albany in 1747 and was sold in 1763.
  was the ex-American Rittenhouse. She was purchased in 1776 and broken up in 1780.

See also
 
 

Royal Navy ship names